Colonel Alfred Spencer Heathcote VC (29 March 1832 – 21 February 1912) was an English recipient of the Victoria Cross.

Biography
Heathcote was the son of Henry Spencer Heathcote and Anne Currie, and nephew of Sir Frederick Currie, 1st Baronet and Vice-Admiral Mark John Currie. He was educated at Winchester College.

He was awarded the VC for the following deed, which took place at the Siege of Delhi during the Indian Mutiny, when he was 25 years old and a lieutenant in the 60th Rifles (later The King's Royal Rifle Corps), British Army.

Further information
He later achieved the rank of colonel and emigrated to Australia. He was the first appointed infantry regiment commander in the Colony of New South Wales – appointed to command in August 1870 at Victoria Barracks, Sydney. 
He is buried, along with his wife Mary Harriet, at the Bowral Cemetery,(Kangaloon Road). His grave is 18 metres to the immediate left upon entering the cemetery gate. His grave is marked by a large grey granite cross. R.I.P.Bowral, New South Wales, Australia (Grave to left of entrance. Headstone). There is also a memorial for him at St. James' Anglican Church, Sydney, New South Wales.

The medal
His Victoria Cross is displayed at the Victoria Barracks in Sydney, New South Wales, Australia.

See also
Heathcote (surname)

References

1832 births
1912 deaths
King's Royal Rifle Corps officers
British recipients of the Victoria Cross
Indian Rebellion of 1857 recipients of the Victoria Cross
English emigrants to Australia
Military personnel from London
British Army personnel of the Second Opium War
British Army recipients of the Victoria Cross
People educated at Winchester College
Burials in New South Wales